Events in the year 2022 in Croatia.

Incumbents 
 President: Zoran Milanović
 Prime Minister: Andrej Plenković

Events 
 10 March - 2022 Zagreb Tu-141 crash
 21-24 April - 2022 Croatia Rally
 6 August - 2022 Croatian bus crash

References 

 
Croatia
Croatia
2020s in Croatia
Years of the 21st century in Croatia